Highway 967 is a provincial highway in the Canadian province of Saskatchewan. It runs from Sturgeon Landing to the Manitoba border. Highway 967 is about 5 km (3 mi.) long. For part of the year, it is cut off from the rest of the province and its only connection is into Manitoba.

See also
Roads in Saskatchewan
Transportation in Saskatchewan

References

967